Megan Rohrer (born 1980) is an American Lutheran minister and activist. Rohrer was the first openly transgender minister ordained in the Lutheran tradition. Following their reception as a minister in the Evangelical Lutheran Church in America, Rohrer served the church as bishop of its Sierra Pacific Synod from 2021 until asked to resign in June of 2022 after allegations of racism against one of the pastors under their care came to light.

Early life and education
Rohrer was born on April 3, 1980, in Sioux Falls, South Dakota. In 1998, they graduated from high school and enrolled at Augustana University to study religion. In college they came out as gay, and became president of the gay–straight alliance. They encountered resistance, threats, and attempted "cures" by fellow students for their sexuality. Rohrer graduated from Augustana in 2001.

Rohrer moved to the San Francisco Bay Area in 2002 to continue their studies. By this time they had come to identify as transgender. Rohrer attended Pacific Lutheran Theological Seminary before transferring to the Pacific School of Religion (PSR) in Berkeley, California, earning a Master of Divinity degree from PSR in 2005 and a Doctor of Ministry degree in 2016.

Personal life
Rohrer claims to be related to Nicholas of Flüe in the 16th generation.

Rohrer goes by he and they pronouns.

Career
Rohrer was ordained in 2006, later becoming the first openly transgender person to serve as a minister in the Evangelical Lutheran Church in America.

In 2010, Rohrer and six other Bay Area gay and transgender pastors were reinstated into the Evangelical Lutheran Church in America, after the national assembly voted to allow partnered gay people to serve as clergy. The pastors' churches had previously been removed from the denomination for ordaining gay and lesbian ministers who refused to adhere to the denomination's document guiding clergy conduct, "Visions and Expectations". At the time "Visions and Expectations" required that candidates for and persons on the clergy roster remain celibate outside of legal marriage and monogamous within marriage.

In 2014, Rohrer was installed as pastor of Grace Evangelical Lutheran Church in San Francisco.

In 2017, Rohrer was hired by the San Francisco Police Department as their first chaplain from the LGBTQ community.

On May 8, 2021, Rohrer was elected bishop of the Sierra Pacific Synod, becoming the first openly trans person to serve as bishop of a major US Christian denomination. On September 11, 2021, Rohrer was installed as bishop.

On December 11, 2021, the Sierra Pacific Synod terminated the employment of Nelson Rabell-González, who presided over Misión Latina Luterana in Stockton, California, and defunded the congregation. The congregation was uninformed about the decision and Rohrer, who attended the service there the next day, declined to provide an explanation. Members of the congregation protested the decision and left the building with a statue of the Virgin of Guadalupe to worship elsewhere. Rohrer also allegedly threatened to call the police on a father and child who remained in the sacristy. Later that month, the Extraordinary Lutheran Ministries suspended Rohrer from their membership for alleged "racist words and actions". In February 2022, the synod announced that Rabell-González was removed for "continual communications of verbal harassment and retaliatory actions from more than a dozen victims," which Rabell-González has denied. On May 27, 2022, Presiding Bishop Elizabeth Eaton called for Rohrer's resignation, but initially declined to pursue disciplinary actions.

On June 3, 2022, the governing body of the Sierra Pacific Synod considered a resolution asking for Rohrer's resignation but, if Rohrer refused, for them to be dismissed through formal adjudication. Out of the 324 legal votes cast, 183 voted for the resolution and 138 voted against. Since passage of this resolution required a two-thirds majority the resolution was defeated. On June 4, following an announcement by Eaton that she would be "initiating the discipline process immediately including suspension of Bishop Rohrer, based on additional information that has come to light", Rohrer resigned as bishop.

On March 1, 2023, Rohrer filed a lawsuit against the ELCA and Sierra Pacific Synod, seeking monetary damages for gender discrimination, openly hostile work environment and workplaceharassment.

Activism
Rohrer has helped the homeless in San Francisco, serving as Executive Director of the Welcome ministry to the homeless and hungry, leading the Singers of the Street choir, distributing sandwiches, and participating in a night ministry with other local pastors. Rohrer has also helped to grow and distribute thousands of pounds of free food from community gardens.

In 2015, Rohrer started a fundraiser to raise bail for Meagan Taylor, a black trans woman who was held in isolation in an Iowa jail.

In the wake of the 2016 Oakland warehouse fire, in which at least three transgender people were killed, Rohrer was called upon by the city of Oakland to provide support and assistance to the community.

Rohrer has advocated for trans people who would be negatively impacted by proposed "bathroom bills" that seek to restrict restroom usage based on sex assigned at birth.

In 2021, Rohrer shared their experiences of being a pastor during the COVID-19 pandemic, and advocated for LGBTQ community members to get vaccinated.

Awards, honors, and recognition
 2012 — "Pastor Megan Rohrer Day" declared on August 12 by the San Francisco Board of Supervisors
 2014 — Honorable Mention, Unsung Hero of Compassion (awarded by the Dalai Lama)
 2014 — Award of Merit for Zanderology: Disability 101 (director), International Film Festival for Spirituality, Religion, and Visionary
 2015 — Distinguished Alumni/ae, Pacific School of Religion
 2015 — Soldier of Social Change, San Francisco Magazine
 Honorary Doctorate, Palo Alto University
 Lambda Literary Award finalist, transgender nonfiction

Selected publications
Through Grace Lutheran Church and Wilgefortis Press, Rohrer has written a number of books for children in the Good News Children's Book Series.

Adult titles authored or co-authored by Rohrer include:

References

External links

Living people
1980 births
21st-century American Lutheran clergy
Augustana University alumni
Transgender non-binary people
American non-binary people
American transgender people
American LGBT rights activists
Religious leaders from the San Francisco Bay Area
LGBT people from South Dakota
LGBT Lutheran clergy
LGBT people from California
People from Sioux Falls, South Dakota
LGBT Christians
Lutheran chaplains
Homelessness activists
Non-binary activists
Religious leaders from South Dakota
21st-century Lutheran bishops
21st-century American LGBT people
Pacific School of Religion alumni